Torpedo, or Torpedo 1936, is a Spanish comics series written by Enrique Sánchez Abulí and drawn by Jordi Bernet, which depicts the adventures of the antagonistic character Luca Torelli, a heartless hitman, and his sidekick Rascal, in context of the violent organized crime culture of New York City during the Great Depression era.

Publication history
The series was originally developed by Abulí and veteran artist Alex Toth, who drew the first two stories in 1981. The collaboration ended when Toth decided he did not share Abulí's darkly humorous view of mankind and frequent use of profanity, and withdrew from the project. He was then replaced by Jordi Bernet, whose gritty, if stylized, artistic style was well suited for the dark and violent subject matter.

Torpedo 1936 was first published in issue 32 of the Spanish horror comics magazine Creepy in February, 1982. The first two issues featured Toth's artwork, and starting in issue #34, with the story De perro a perro, Bernet was responsible for the drawings. Torpedo went on to be featured in several Spanish comics magazines, such as Thriller, Comix International, Totem el comix, Co & Co and Viñetas, and albums were published, translated into several languages. The public response to the series became substantial, and it was awarded with the 1986 Angoulême Best Foreign Album Award. Eventually, a dedicated magazine named Luca Torelli es Torpedo started publication in May 1991.

Character history
Luca Torelli is born in Sicily circa 1903, to a poor, broken home marked by spousal abuse. His parents are presumed to be Vittorio Torelli and Luciana Petrosino, although his older brother's real father was actually their grandfather (who raped his own daughter) and it is implied that Luca's own biological father was the local mafioso kingpin, who raped Luciana in exchange for mediating peacefully in the feud between the Torellis and the Petrosinos. Luca loses his older brother to a severe beating by their drunken father, orchestrates a vengeance against the latter by using a vindictive neighbour as an unwitting agent, and finally witnesses their mother dying of sorrow upon her son's and husband's consecutive deaths, thereupon being fostered by his uncle Vincenzo. Despite the fact that he engineered his father's death at the hands of their neighbour, the ancestral institution of vendetta prevails and Luca kills him with his uncle's aid; this is implied to be his first direct murder. He is then forced to flee for America as a teenager where he works as a shoe shiner, thereby meeting an abusive senior police officer named MacDonald whom he finally shoots, being involved in other law infringements, such as bank robberies, which also happen to end in murders, and soon becoming a hit man ("torpedo" is 1920s slang for a contract killer). Some time later, he gets a Polish American sidekick called Rascal.

From here onwards it is difficult to maintain a linear narrative since no dates are given (aside from incidental details such as the Volstead Act, the outburst of the Spanish civil war and, later in the series, the Cuban revolution). Apart from Rascal and characters in flashback stories, there are few recurring characters and few dates are given for his present day stories. The only significant recurring character is a woman called Susan who consistently outwits Torelli. She appears in the first story by Bernet (De perro a perro), a second one still early on (La dama de los camelos), and one of the latest (El día de la mala baba). At least thirteen years are said to have passed between her second and third appearance; she is assumed to be a high-profile prostitute in the first two (whose services had been solicited by Torelli himself in the past), and a "reformed", recently widowed housewife and mother, who had presumably "screwed her [old and rich] husband to death", as Torelli puts it, in the third.

Bibliography (Spain)

All published by Glénat:
 Torpedo T1
 Torpedo T2: Qué tiempos aquellos
 Torpedo T3
 Torpedo T4: El arte de rematar
 Torpedo T5: Sing-Sing Blues
 Torpedo T6
 Torpedo T7
 Torpedo T8: La ley del Talón (1994)
 Torpedo T9: Toccata y fuga
 Torpedo T10: No es oro todo lo que seduce (1993)
 Torpedo T11: El partido
 Torpedo T12
 Torpedo T13: Cuba
 Torpedo T14: ¡Adiós muñeco!
 Torpedo T15: El día de la mala baba
Integral collections
 Torpedo Obra Completa Vol. 1. (2004) Containing:
Luca Torelli es... Torpedo (Torpedo 1936 Cap.1, Torpedo 1936 Cap.2, De perro a perro, Érase un chivato, Conmigo no se juega)
Qué tiempos aquellos (Qué tiempos aquellos, Dumbo, Un solo de trompeta, R.I.P. y amén, El cambiazo)
Flash-Back (Flash-Back, El tipo que no se chupaba el dedo, La noche de San Valentón, El negro que puso los ojos en blanco, Año nuevo muerte nueva)
 Torpedo Obra Completa Vol. 2 (2004) Containing:
El arte de rematar (El arte de rematar, Tócala otra vez, Sam; Tic-Tac, La dama de los camelos, Rascal)
Sing-sing Blues (Sing-sing blues, Más ruda será la caída, Miami bitch, West sad story, Dos hombres y un destino)
Un salario de miedo
 Torpedo Obra Completa Vol. 3 (2004) Containing:
Érase una vez en Italia (Érase una vez en Italia, Llamad a cualquier puta, La hiena ríe de 4 a 6, En nombre de la Lou, Ceniciento)
La ley del talón
Toccata y fuga (Levántate y anda, Toccata y fuga, Un día en las carreras, Tres hombres y un biberón, Tirando hacia atrás con ira)
 Torpedo Obra Completa Vol. 4 (2004) Containing:
No es oro todo lo que seduce (La otra cara de la monada, Las 7 vidas del gato, La paloma de la paz, No es oro todo lo que seduce, Iré a escupir sobre vuestra timba)
El partido (El partido, Sodoma y camorra, Lolita, Más dura será la recaída, Un alto en el camino, Coyote)
El sórdido (El sórdido, La madrina, El atracón, Adivina quién palma esta noche, ¿Quién teme al lobo feroz?, Una, dos y tres)
 Torpedo Obra Completa Vol. 5 (2004)
Adiós muñeco, Bendita vendetta, El año que bebimos peligrosamente, La Tapadera, Pietro
 Los relatos de Torpedo

References

Sources
 Index of Torpedo publications in Creepy Tebeosfera 
 Torpedo albums Ediciones Glénat 
 Torpedo albums Bedetheque

External links
 Torpedo article on fandecomix 
 Index in English of French series

Spanish comic strips
1982 comics debuts
2004 comics endings
Characters created by Alex Toth
Crime comics
Humor comics
Comics set in the 1920s
Comics set in the 1930s
Spanish comics characters
Comics characters introduced in 1982
Fictional gangsters
Fictional Sicilian people
Fictional rapists